Fellows of the Royal Society elected in 1797.

Fellows

 George Aust (d. c.1829), Under Secretary of State for Foreign Affairs
 William Battine (1765–1836), Barrister 
 Henry Browne (c.1754–1830), Barrister 
 James Brodie(1744–1824), MP 
 Robert Capper (1767–1851), barrister
 Robert Clifford (1767–1817) 
 William Cumberland Cruikshank (1745–1800), surgeon 
 Stephen Eaton (d. 1806), Archdeacon of Middlesex
 George Ellis (1753–1815), MP, poet, playwright 
 Samuel Ferris (died 1831), physician 
 Charles Freeman (d. 1823), Indian Civil Service 
 Andrew Snape Hamond (1738–1828), Comptroller of the Navy
 Charles Hatchett (1765–1847), chemist and mineralogist  
 John Heaviside (1748–1828), surgeon
 Robert Holmes, (1748–1805), Dean of Winchester
 Daniel Lysons (1762–1834), clergyman
 Samuel Lysons (1763–1819), barrister 
 Bartholomew Parr (1750–1810), physician 
 Edward Adolphus Seymour, 11th Duke of Somerset (1775–1855) 
 John Spalding (d. 1815), MP 
 Sir John St Aubyn, 5th Baronet (1758–1839), MP 
 Isaac Titsingh (d. 1812), Dutch merchant 
 John Towneley (d. 1814), Trustee of British Museum 
 George Whitmore (d. 1805) 
 George Wyndham, 3rd Earl of Egremont (1751–1837) 
 Prince William Frederick, Duke of Gloucester and Edinburgh (1776–1834), Royal Member
 Frederick I of Württemberg (1754–1816), Honorary Member

References

1797 in science
1797
1797 in Great Britain